La Neuville-Roy is a commune in the Oise department in northern France.

The commune was formerly called Laneuvilleroy and was officially renamed La Neuville-Roy on August 26, 2004.

See also
Communes of the Oise department

References

Communes of Oise